Landa is a surname. Notable people with the surname include:

 Alfredo Landa (1933–2013), Spanish actor
 Benny Landa (born 1946) Israeli entrepreneur and inventor
 Diego de Landa (1524 – 1579), fourth bishop of Yucatán
 Daniel Landa (born 1968), Czech musician
 Eli Landa (born 1984), Norwegian model
 Honorino Landa (1942–1987), Chilean soccer player
 Konstantin Landa (1972–2022), Russian chess grandmaster
 Lucas Landa (born 1986), Argentine soccer player
 Manuel de Landa (born 1952), Mexican-American writer
 Miguel Ángel Landa (born 1938), Venezuelan actor, stand-up comedian, and television personality
 Mikel Landa (born 1989), Spanish racing cyclist
 Oryan Landa (born 1980), American actor
 Rebecca Landa (born 1955), American speech-language pathologist

Fictional characters:
 Hans Landa, character in the film Inglourious Basterds

References

Norwegian-language surnames
Czech-language surnames
Polish-language surnames
Spanish-language surnames
Basque-language surnames
Jewish surnames